Secret Agent Man is an American spy-fi television series that aired on UPN from 7 March to 28 July 2000. The series was created by writer Richard Regen.

Premise 
Secret Agent Man starred Costas Mandylor as Monk, a gallivanting secret agent, who was one of a team of agents that included Holliday, played by Dina Meyer and Davis, played by Dondre Whitfield. The team reported to Brubeck, played by Paul Guilfoyle. The periodically appearing guest villain is the former agent Prima, played by Musetta Vander.

All the lead characters share the last names of jazz musicians Thelonious Monk, Billie Holiday, Miles Davis, Dave Brubeck and Louis Prima.

Cast

Main
 Costas Mandylor as Monk
 Dina Meyer as Holliday
 Dondre Whitfield as Davis
 Paul Guilfoyle as Brubeck

Notable guest stars

 Musetta Vander as Prima
 Grace Park as Louann
 John de Lancie as Marshall Gilder
 Diane Farr as Trish Fiore
 Ivana Milicevic as Laura Tupolev
 Lola Glaudini as Helga Devereaux
 Salli Richardson-Whitfield as Rachel
 Alexondra Lee as Nurse 613
 Wade Williams as Greg

Production 
Secret Agent Man was originally scheduled to premiere on UPN in September 1999, but was pushed back to a midseason premiere in August 2000 due to the desire to give the show's producers more time to work on props and special effects. It also did not have a traditional one-hour pilot filmed, and was instead ordered to series by UPN on the strength of just a presentation reel. Only 12 episodes were produced and broadcast before the series was cancelled due to poor ratings.

Theme song 
The series used an updated version of the 1960s Johnny Rivers hit, "Secret Agent Man", performed by Supreme Beings of Leisure, for its theme song. Because the original version of this song was also used as the theme song for American broadcasts of another television series, the 1960s British TV series, Danger Man (primarily broadcast in the U.S. as Secret Agent), there were some mistaken impressions that this series was somehow a spin off or remake of the earlier program, but other than the theme song, no connections were made evident.

Episodes

References

External links 
 
 Variety Series Information
 Variety Review

2000 American television series debuts
2000 American television series endings
UPN original programming
Espionage television series
Television series by Sony Pictures Television
Television shows filmed in Vancouver